Gavini may refer to:

 Denis Gavini (1820-1916), French Bonapartist politician
 Weejasperaspis gavini, an extinct acanthothoracid placoderm found in the eastern Victoria, Australia
 21515 Gavini, a minor planet discovered at Soccorro in 1988
 Gavinus (died 303), Christian saint, one of the Martyrs of Torres

See also
 Gavina (disambiguation)